The 1953 British Grand Prix was a Formula Two motor race held on 18 July 1953 at Silverstone Circuit. It was race 6 of 9 in the 1953 World Championship of Drivers, which was run to Formula Two rules in 1952 and 1953, rather than the Formula One regulations normally used. The 90-lap race was won by Ferrari driver Alberto Ascari after he started from pole position. Juan Manuel Fangio finished second for the Maserati team and Ascari's teammate Nino Farina came in third.

Background 
The Ferrari and Maserati lineup was unchanged from the French Grand Prix. Initially three Cooper Mk IIs were entered for Peter Whitehead, Tony Crook and Stirling Moss. However, due to Moss's retirement at the French Grand Prix his car had to be withdrawn.

Classification

Qualifying

Race 

Notes
 – Includes 0.5 points for shared fastest lap

Championship standings after the race 
Drivers' Championship standings

Note: Only the top five positions are included. Only the best 4 results counted towards the Championship. Numbers without parentheses are Championship points; numbers in parentheses are total points scored.

References

British Grand Prix
British Grand Prix
1953 in British motorsport